The 2021 Ohio Valley Conference women's basketball tournament ended the 2020–21 season of Ohio Valley Conference women's basketball. The tournament was held March 3–6, 2021, at Ford Center in Evansville, Indiana. The Belmont Bruins won the title, their fifth in the OVC, and will receive a bid to the 2021 NCAA Tournament.

Seeds

Schedule and results

Bracket
 All times central.

References

2020–21 Ohio Valley Conference women's basketball season
Ohio Valley Conference women's basketball tournament
Basketball competitions in Evansville, Indiana
Women's sports in Indiana
College basketball tournaments in Indiana
2021 in sports in Indiana